Achewood is a webcomic created by Chris Onstad in 2001. It portrays the lives of a group of anthropomorphic stuffed toys, robots, and pets. Many of the characters live together in the home of their owner, Chris, at the fictional address of 62 Achewood Court. The events of the strip mostly take place in, and around the house, as well as around the town of Achewood, the fictional suburb which gives its name to the comic.

The comic's humor is most often absurdist, typically lacking a traditional set punchline, and very often moves to the highly surreal. The world of the strip is expansive, featuring many major and minor characters with detailed backstories, and often references previous events, making it an ongoing narrative. As Onstad is a food and cooking enthusiast, many Achewood strips contain some reference to food or drink.

Originally published regularly, the comic began to skip days in late 2010, and in March 2011 Onstad announced that Achewood would be going on an indefinite hiatus. In November 2011 the comic returned, followed by an announcement in December that the hiatus was over. However, Chris Onstad has stated that no regular schedule will be in effect, and new strips have been sporadic. Onstad indicated in 2012 his plans for pitching Achewood as an animated series. No further news has come on this front, and the comic itself was not updated between April 7, 2014, and December 24, 2015.

The strip returned on December 24, 2015, and was updated most subsequent Fridays. On December 25, 2016, Onstad announced that the strip was again on hiatus.

History and overview
The first Achewood strip ("Philippe is standing on it") was released on October 1, 2001. The strip sets the tone for future strips with its nonsensical humor and flat visual punchline. In this particular strip, Mr. Bear and Téodor are discussing Téodor's confusion over a drum machine. Mr. Bear informs Téodor that there is an instruction manual. However, Philippe is standing on it.

Throughout Achewood, there is no distinguishable underlying storyline—aside from, perhaps, the general passing of time and development of the comic's characters and their interrelationships. Onstad's preferred method of story telling is to develop his characters through one-off strips and short story arcs. Strips are humorous, relying upon bizarre and chaotic humor as well as social stereotypes; obscure, burlesque literary and historical references, and strong characterization of the comic's many quirky individuals.

The humor often depends on an in-depth knowledge of the characters and their interactions; a drop-down box on the lower right side of the home page links to the beginning of 46 story arcs from 2002 to 2010. Story arcs are often interrupted as the main action "cuts away" to the activity of other Achewood characters, which may or may not tie in with the main storyline.

Most strips include an alt text, a one-sentence aside written in Onstad's voice that appears when the reader hovers the cursor over the strip. The first alt-text was the word snif on Christmas, 2001. The first of the regular full-sentence alt-text appeared on January 2, 2002, apparently excusing a weak strip: "whatever. it was late and a friend was over." The most frequently used font in the strip is Blue Highway, which does not contain any italic characters.

Chris Onstad has self-published sixteen books: seven collections of Achewood comics, two books by character Nice Pete (A Wonderful Tale and A Hilarious Comedy), six 'zines by another named Roast Beef, and Recipes for a Lady or a Man: The Achewood Cookbook with recipes from several of the main characters. A second cookbook, titled The Achewood Cookbook II was announced and paid pre-orders were taken, but it never shipped.

In October 2002, Achewood "Sunday Edition" became part of the online alternative comics anthology Serializer. In their review of serializer.net, The Comics Journal wrote: "It's a pleasure to see strips like Achewood's 'Sunday' strip ... use the newspaper format for far more daring, entertainingly perverse work ... would be perfectly at home at a good alternative weekly or a great college paper." Achewood is sometimes featured in the Chaparral, Stanford University's humor publication, of which Onstad is an editor emeritus.

On April 30, 2003, Onstad introduced a new feature to the Achewood universe—an advice column written by the character Ray called Ray's Place. The column has developed characters, mainly as perceived by Ray.  It also allows for an interaction between reader and character, a novelty in comic art.

July 2004 saw the introduction of several in-character blogs. The main characters all began writing (using Blogger) to speak to their audience. Onstad stated in an interview that he found the blogs easier to maintain than the strip, as they do not require as much refining.

In late 2004, it was announced that Checker Book Publishing Group was to release a collection of Achewood comics later that year. Checker had signed Chris Onstad to a three-book deal that was to begin in November 2004. However, the deal was canceled soon after due to creative differences.

On September 12, 2007, Achewood was named "Funniest Webcomic" by humor website Cracked.com.

Onstad participated in Song Fight! by creating cover art and title for "What We Need More of is Science", "Red Skates", and "Livin' at the Corner of Dude and Catastrophe". The first title originated as a Roast Beef expression on merchandise. One Song Fight! entry was performed by the Milwaukee Youth Center Choir, who also wrote and recorded a theme for Ray's Place, Ray's advice column. An entry by MC Frontalot won the latest Song Fight! and is now the current theme song for the comic.

Time magazine named Achewood its #1 graphic novel of 2007.

On September 10, 2008, Dark Horse Comics published a 104-page extended version of "The Great Outdoor Fight" story arc, with a deleted scene, background material on the fight and other original content.

As the strip has developed, individual comics have become generally longer, moving from three to four panels on a single line per comic to large comics incorporating dozens of panels on ten or more lines.

Dark Horse has subsequently published, in October 2009, the first several years of Achewood comics under the title of Achewood Volume Two: Worst Song, Played On Ugliest Guitar, including notes on each strip by Onstad.  A third volume,  Achewood Volume Three: A Home For Scared People, was published in December 2010 and contains strips up to the end of October 2002.

The regular appearance of new comics slowed considerably in late 2010. On March 20, 2011, Onstad posted on his blog that Achewood would be on an indefinite hiatus. Between November 2011, and June 2012, Onstad posted comics on an erratic basis, with up to four comics per month, then resumed regular, weekly new comics from August 2013 to April 7, 2014.

Onstad resumed posting comics on December 24, 2015, with the first new strip in 20 months, and continued to update the site on most subsequent Fridays throughout 2016. On December 25, 2016, Onstad announced that he was "walking away" from the strip and that it would be entering another extended hiatus period.

Etymology
According to the comic's official website, "achewood" was an ingredient used by enslaved people during the United States' antebellum era in the production of "achewater", a now outlawed Southern drink with psychedelic properties, similar to the use of wormwood in the production of absinthe. This liquor would supposedly induce melancholia in the drinker, hence the name.

The Underground
The Achewood Underground is an underground version of the human city above, inhabited and run by animals both stuffed and real, as well as several robots. The Underground has its own businesses and establishments that parallel those above ground, and its inhabitants often steal or borrow things from their human counterparts above ground. Aside from Achewood, it is assumed that most cities around the world have their own undergrounds as well.

The Overground
The geography of the Achewood Overground is based on that of the Palo Alto/Stanford area. Dexter University corresponds to Stanford University, Achewood Heights is equivalent to Menlo Park, East Achewood is analogous to East Palo Alto, and the Achewood Estates/Achewood areas refer to areas of Palo Alto.

Major characters

Raymond Quentin Smuckles 
Raymond Quentin "Ray" Smuckles is a cat, specifically, an American Curl, a breed that originated from Lakewood, California. Ray is financially successful after selling his soul to the devil in exchange for success in pop music. He claims to have expertise in such diverse fields as cookery, alcohol, underground street dancing, piano playing, entrepreneurship, and women. Ray made his first appearance on January 10, 2002. Along with his best friend Roast Beef, Ray has become the central character of the strip; their relationship lies at the heart of Achewood. Ray can be identified by his designer glasses, his habitual wearing of a thong since the January 14, 2002, strip, the occasional fur coat, and a gold medallion which once belonged to the fictitious Incan god of fun, "King Chochacho". Ray often speaks of his heritage: his mother's family, the Culpeppers, are French Catholic Southern gentry, while his fathers, the Smuckles, are a diverse collection of tough, philosophical underworld characters (more below).

Ray tends to be rather lucky, acquiring money in a variety of ways, including a record contract with Sony (after selling his soul to the devil for a piano that grants the buyer musical genius), an auspicious eBay's purchase of vintage erotica valued at 600 million dollars, and various business ventures. Ray is the founder, president, and CEO of Prime Time Records, which releases mostly rap music. Through eBay Platinum Reserve, he now owns Airwolf, Keith Moon's head, and the world's biggest laser. He enjoys throwing lavish parties with unusual themes. Ray drives a Cadillac Escalade. He is very generous to his friends and to people in general, but on an entirely random basis and interspersed with long periods of outright rudeness and total insensitivity. He also has a very serious obsession with Ketel One and Zinfandel alcohols. Although Ray personally obtained his musical skills from a deal with the devil, there has been at least one other musical genius in his lineage: his paternal grandfather Antonyne Cheops Smuckles, better known as the legendary bluesman Rustmouth Chafings.

On the other hand, he has a weakness for gambling, and often loses up to thousands of dollars while playing golf and pool with his friends. Ray has a penchant for prank calls, whether outgoing (Marmaduke, Cathy), or incoming (telemarketers). Although he has never openly admitted it, it is clear that he has a sexual fetish for women sitting on birthday cakes, as the subject has come up several times in connection with Ray. Ray drinks alcohol throughout the day; numerous strips imply that he is an alcoholic, and his physician, Dr. Andretti, has repeatedly warned him that he is in severe danger of becoming diabetic. (Ray is somewhat overweight and potbellied.) A few years into the strip, Ray learned his father, Ramses Luther Smuckles, won the 1973 "Great Outdoor Fight", a fictional free-for-all combat challenge that allows only one entrant among three thousand to emerge victorious. This inspired Ray to enter the 2006 fight, where he defeated everyone else in the fight except for Roast Beef (see below), and demolished the fight grounds when he discovered that fight regulations required that he beat Beef to unconsciousness in order to win.  Ray has at least one half-brother, named Dornheim Smuckles, who is also the son of Ramses Luther Smuckles. A young cat who lives with Ray—Charley "Little Nephew" Smuckles—referred to him as "Uncle". Little Nephew's parentage has never been clearly established. Recently, Little Nephew began a friendship with Molly's long-deceased brother Taffy. Molly's father Iowerth appears to have killed Little Nephew in order to bring him back to what is either 17th-century Wales or an afterlife which resembles it, in order to keep Taffy company. When threatened with legal action based on Little Nephew's truancy, Ray traveled through time to retrieve him, and though he later had a change of heart and gave Charley his blessing to return to ancient Wales, the magic poncho he used no longer works, and it can be assumed that Little Nephew still lives with Ray.

Ray writes an advice column Ray's Place on the Achewood site, though there is a disclaimer at the bottom warning that the advice is in fact from a cartoon cat, and perhaps should not be taken very seriously. Ray's Place appeared to have been abandoned in 2007; however, a new one was written in July 2010.

Ray was originally introduced as a minor supporting character, part of a trio of cats (along with Roast Beef and Pat) who were always seen together, and fancied themselves "the dirtiest dudes in town" due to their reputed penchant for foul language. As time passed, Onstad began to give the three cats individual personalities, and before long the focus of Achewood began to move away from the four stuffed animals living in the Onstad residence and onto Ray and Beef, making them breakout characters. The increasingly abrasive Pat remained in a supporting role, eventually turning the trio into a duo.

Ray is a member of a syndicate of other flamboyantly rich, jive-talking cats, including "AKKOLADE" and Bensington Butters, his rival. They spend their time at theme parties and weekend retreats while plotting to sabotage each other's images.

"Roast Beef" Kazenzakis
Roast Beef Kazenzakis' birth name was "Cassandra",  as he was born intersex and the doctor mistakenly predicted that he would develop female characteristics. It has never been explained where the "Roast Beef" nickname originated, though he was seen to have it in flashbacks to his early childhood. Beef, like Ray, is a cat, and is interested in computer programming. He has a wife, Molly Sanders, whom he met in heaven during a near-death experience. Beef "visited" Molly there twice: once after being shot by Pat and once after driving a golf cart off a cliff while high on marijuana.  Molly eventually moved to Earth to be with Beef, who asked her to marry him on June 7, 2007, with the wedding taking place on 5 July 2008 (the actual wedding comic was posted on 15 July, but subscribers to Achewood premium updates were able to follow the wedding taking place on the 5th). Roast Beef has one brother, Michael Kazenzakis, who goes by the name 'Showbiz' and enjoys drinking Tequizas. Showbiz attempted to sabotage Roast Beef's wedding, for the sole reason that he believed that once married, Molly would prevent Beef from loaning him any more money. Fortunately, he was foiled in this endeavor, as Beef anticipated such action from Showbiz and arranged things so he'd be arrested and stay in jail for the duration of the wedding.

Roast Beef had a desperately unhappy and impoverished childhood, ranging from simple lack of food due to poverty to an incident where he overheard his mother killing his father, apparently in self-defense. He does not like to discuss his childhood, generally referring to it simply by saying he is "from Circumstances". Beef has seemingly incurable depression, Seasonal Affective Disorder, and/or Avoidant personality disorder, and considers suicide often, though no one seems to care. Recently, however, his depression seems to have improved, particularly since he met Molly. Molly has also gotten him a light therapy lamp, which helps when he remembers to use it. For a long time he lived in a trailer with his abusive grandmother, Gramma K., but has since moved out of the trailer, and into Ray's pool shed. His speech balloons use a slightly smaller font than that of other characters and rarely include punctuation, to emphasize his timidity and unique manner of speech. Roast Beef possesses an impressive vocabulary and will, on occasion, sprinkle words such as "insatiable", "phenomena", or "corpulent" into his normally slang-filled dialog.

He has been shot at least four times. One shooting lodged a bullet in his spine, which grants him permanent wireless Internet access (though this has only been mentioned once since, and he still uses physical computers to access the net). Another shooting resulted in his cardio-pulmonary system being replaced by that of an AIBO. He has also been shot at least one additional time by Ray and once fatally by Lie Bot (who was masquerading as Ray's uncle Culpepper).

Roast Beef's birthday is April 22. Some of his accomplishments include a program that determines how many eggs and how much milk you need to buy in a given week, and another that determines the amount of loose change lying around your house and makes a reservation at a restaurant accordingly. Roast Beef is partial to UNIX and his preferred programming language is Java. He likes Stella Artois beer and Guinness. He is perhaps the world's greatest historian of the Great Outdoor Fight, and drove Ray to compete (and win) in the 2006 Fight. He also managed to get into the Fight himself by hacking into the Fight's database. He fully accepted the fact that Ray would have to beat him senseless in order to win, and was shocked beyond belief when Ray destroyed the Fight rather than fight him. He drives a 1965 Ford Galaxie (powered by Ford's rare 427 SOHC V8 engine) that was a gift from Ray. He has also gone to the Moon, by stealing Pat's home-made rocket, and to the afterlife (both heaven and hell), via various methods including some of the aforementioned shooting incidents and vomiting into an electrical outlet. He has also produced his very own zine, titled Man Why You Even Got To Do A Thing.

Roast Beef has written a number of poems, both in the strip and on his blog. A recurrent theme involves weapons disguised as food, and these normally conclude with 'OHHH SHIIIT!'.

According to Onstad, Roast Beef is one of several important foils to the increasingly central character of Ray. Ray's consistent optimism, sexual bravado, unwavering confidence, privileged upbringing, simple attitudes, and good luck makes him seem on the surface a complete antithesis of character to Roast Beef. Regardless, the two have been close friends since childhood, and it may be observed that as the strip progresses, each occasionally adopts the attitudes and perspectives of the other. The two do, of course, have a few points of dissent: Roast Beef is somewhat more sympathetic to Little Nephew than his Uncle Ray, and has taken issue with Ray's alcoholism.

Philippe
Philippe is an undyingly optimistic and naïve young otter who resides in the house with Cornelius Bear, Lyle and Téodor, as well as Chris and Chris's family. His housemates collectively raised him with varied success, with Téodor acting as a nurturing motherly-type; Lyle as a neglectful big brother, and Mr. Bear as a stern but gentle father.
He is separated from his mother, who lives in Ohio, but they talk on the phone frequently, and have a close relationship. (At the time The Achewood Cookbook came out, she was in Iowa.) Other than the fact that he is deceased, nothing is known about Philippe's father, although he appeared in one strip thus far in a dream. He is implied to be of French descent, and to have fought in a war as a youth. From time to time, Philippe's mother sends him unusual presents.

Philippe seems to be perpetually five years old, and celebrates his fifth birthday every year. A strip which revealed the future of the Achewood characters showed that Philippe will still be the same age, even after the other characters grow old and die.  A later comic has Philippe returning home to live with his mother, once again, with further evidence toward his agelessness.

A song by the synth-pop band Freezepop titled "Here Comes a Special Boy" about the character of Philippe can be downloaded from Freezepop's website. Additionally, the Song Fight! Entries for "What We Need More Of Is Science" by Brody and Octothorpe are two different versions of the same song about Philippe.

Cornelius Bear
Often referred to as Mr. Bear (and "Connie" by Ray), he is a scholarly and fatherly figure to much of the cast, being much older than most of them — he was married to his first (now deceased) wife, Iris Gambol, sometime before 1967. Chris Onstad said that Cornelius is "sort of my older Anglophile man-of-the-world-type character."

He is unafraid to enjoy a drink of alcohol, and tends to be more erudite and romantic than the rest of the cast. It has also been implied that he has been imprisoned, and has had German, French and Austrian cellmates.

Mr. Bear is an accomplished writer, notably as the author of several children's books, including So Many Whales, The Mayor of Banana Town, the "Oscar" series (including Oscar, Whose Pants Grew Too Small), and — during a somewhat later and darker period — Janet, The Girlfriend Who Could Only Ever Complain and Chug-A-Lug, The Train Who Drank.  He wears pince-nez and is most often attired in an elegant dressing gown. Mr. Bear originally lived on Roxx Street in Cambridge. As his parents were English, Cornelius absorbed British mannerisms as he grew up in the United States. Mr. Bear now lives at 62 Achewood Ct. In 2004, Pat shot Mr. Bear, who survived. Cornelius has been seen driving an Austin Mini with a Laphroaig tap on the dashboard. The driver's seat is on the right-hand side, indicating it was originally sold in Britain. He also owned (and presumably played) a French horn, though Ray wound up stepping on it by mistake.

Mr. Bear seems to command respect from nearly every member of the cast — with the noteworthy exception of the brash and petulant Lyle. This can be seen in almost every strip in which they both appear.
He also won "The Badass Games," a manliness contest held by Ray and Roast Beef, a rather surprising achievement considering his gentle nature.

Despite a reputation for class, Mr. Bear seems to have surprisingly low standards when it comes to employment. At various times, he has been a writer of genre romance novels, a closed captioner for the Spice Channel, and a paid reader of pre-prepared lectures for Mensa International. More recently Cornelius has become the proprietor of an English pub, a joint venture between himself and Ray. The naming of said pub has been the subject of much deliberation between the two characters although at the time of writing it was designated "The Dude and Catastrophe". Onstad said that the pub is "like a Cheers-type place."

Cornelius has recently begun dating a stripper named Polly. She is literally half his age, but appears to be far more socially adjusted than expected, and this openly baffles the rest of the cast.

Lyle Roscoe Gabriel
A belligerent stuffed tiger who enjoys playing pranks on his friends and takes his alcohol early and often. He is a talented calligrapher and cosmetician, and is apparently knowledgeable about cars. Lyle has a mysterious, possibly criminal, tragic past which caused him to relocate from Gainesville, Florida, to Achewood. For a time he also was employed helping recent Male to Female transsexuals "become sexually active and confident in their new bodies". He has also become involved in pornography. He recently returned from Scotland where he meant to learn how to make Scotch, but instead became trapped at a finishing school, where it was revealed that when he is not completely soused, Lyle is surprisingly intelligent and erudite, concocting an elaborate plan to escape from the finishing school that involved spicing the bland meals in the cafeteria to make them more delicious, so that the staff would feel more relaxed before he even attempted to leave. Despite this, he is clearly far more comfortable with himself while intoxicated; the blog entry that confirmed the success of his escape was supposedly written from a bar, and was a barely legible mess. He's also often seen wearing a Misfits T-shirt.

He lives at 62 Achewood Court. Due to a combination of an illegal u-turn and some word salad, Lyle is a Registered Asshole in the State of California, complete with card and legal obligation to inform all neighbors within a five-block radius of his new status He is an extremely heavy drinker, who often vomits around the house after drinking, sometimes deliberately.  In The Achewood Cookbook, Lyle says that he has held every kind of kitchen job, "from dishwasher to sous" (meaning sous chef). Lyle is close friends with Todd T. Squirrel, who shares his love of inebriation.

Téodor Orezscu
Téodor is a teddy bear. He and his family originate from Minsk, Belarus (his father was an actuary) and is apparently of Jewish descent. He is a skilled cook, musician and graphic designer, and is also an all around friendly guy. He was originally quite crazy and uninhibited, exhibiting nudist tendencies in early Achewood strips, though he seems to have calmed down a bit over the years. While talented and intelligent, Téodor is also portrayed as lacking motivation and direction. A large exception to this is the considerable amount of time he is shown exercising or cooking, of which he is especially fond (every Achewood character has at least a slight interest in cooking, but Téodor's talent in this area is the most proficient). He had an online relationship with a girl named Penny, and eventually it is shown how the relationship ended up. Penny made Téodor the T-emblazoned sweater he wears, leaving it as a gift for him in the April 18, 2002, comic. While the other stuffed animals of the house treat Phillipe as a roommate, Téodor instead fills the role of Phillipe's guardian while the young otter is separated from his mother; he goes as far as to buy numerous child-care books, and, after being forced to expose the boy to Chick Tracts, diffused the effect of the prejudiced papers by making his own, nonsensical tracts to mix in with them. He has appeared in numerous strips recreationally using marijuana and seems to also be a user of psychedelic mushrooms.  Téodor's birthday is in early October. In 2001, Lie Bot predicted Téodor's death would be on April 28, 2005. Téodor did in fact die on that date, after he choked on a Grolsch bottle cap whilst watching a pornographic film. He was revived, however, when Lyle performed a "Longshoreman's Heimlich" (swift kick to the gut), which dislodged the cap and revived him.  Téodor listens to The Cure, Joy Division, and The Smiths.

Onstad has claimed in at least one interview that Téodor is the most autobiographical of the strip's characters, as they are both self-conscious cooks.

Patrick Reynolds
Pat is one of the three original cat characters, along with Roast Beef and Ray. Over the years, his role has receded into the background, but his is still a notable presence. He is a generally unpleasant character — he typically plays the antagonist — and seems to hate anyone that does not live up to his impossibly high standards of behavior. He seems to suffer from Obsessive-compulsive personality disorder and has some anger management problems, for which he attends a support group.  Raymond's mother revealed that Pat also suffers from Crohn's disease, though this could be attributed to some slight senility of hers.

Pat's interests in veganism, Zen Buddhism and his unusual stances on various issues seem to be driven less by an appreciation of the philosophies, but more by a desire to feel superior to his friends, and indeed the rest of the world; a "Mexican magical realism" camera, which shows people as they truly feel about themselves, rather than printing an actual photograph of the person, revealed that despite his aggressive veganism, Pat would prefer to eat large quantities of meat. He will often boycott companies at the slightest perceived provocation. His elitist, negative attitude extends to a particular focus on barbers and hairstylists, whom he absolutely despises, for reasons that are never made clear, as well as toll booth operators, Mexican motorists, and employees with disabilities.

Pat constructed the rocket that Roast Beef stole and rode to the moon. He is technically on the run after escaping from jail (he was convicted for shooting Roast Beef, and later shot Mr. Bear as well, probably by accident), but it does not seem to have affected his lifestyle due to Ray's connections getting him off the hook. He lives quite comfortably on the lam with Peter "Nice Pete" Cropes, a serial killer he met in jail. Nice Pete also attends his support group, implying that the two are quite close. After being electrocuted due to a prank by Lyle and Philippe, he temporarily became much nicer., only to turn back to his usual unpleasant self after being shocked again.

Pat disowned his entertainer father, Simon Reynolds, when the latter came out as a homosexual. Simon has made efforts to reconcile with his son, which Pat has disgustedly repulsed. The entire topic of his father is off limits to Pat, suggesting repression issues. The comic has hinted at this complexity of his character for some time. In 2006, his own latent homosexuality was forced out into the open by the magical Mexican realism camera. Apparently both Pat and his father magically became homosexual due to the curse of Gladdington castle, wherein an ancestor of theirs was cursed such that all of his sons and their sons thereafter would become homosexual at the age of 26. Pat has since become much more comfortable about his homosexuality, using perceived persecution as just another reason to be angry at the world, and has been dating Rod Huggins, a gay porn star.

Molly Sanders
A cat, and Roast Beef's wife. Molly was born in 17th-century Wales. She died in the wreck of the Gwynqeathe in 1676 and went to Heaven, where she was able to keep up on developments in the living world and became interested in modern technology. Roast Beef first met her in Heaven after Pat shot him. Molly now resides on Earth, living in Ray's pool shed with Roast Beef. Roast Beef's lack of social skills means their relationship is often strained, but Molly's extraordinary patience and tolerance (and Beef's willingness to go along with her sexual adventurousness) often win out. Molly may have been a programmer while in Heaven (presumably self-taught), but since she died long before computers and coding were invented she has no "earthly" qualifications as such. She has been working in the service industry since coming back to life; she has implied in her blog that she is unable to get better work because she does not have a social security card. She has held jobs at various bars and restaurants, including Applebee's, Taco Bell (from which she was fired), and The Smoke (a local bar in the Underground). For a time, Molly worked at an "upscale tex-mex place" called Butte, until a fire forced its closure. Molly was involved in "sandwich porn" for Vlad when she worked at his Subway restaurant, eating client-ordered sandwiches on a live webcam show, fully clothed and in a broom closet, though Beef demanded that she stop once he found out. Molly has now secured a job at Starbucks which she claims makes her "the hub of Achewood's social universe." She has been running the "Achewood A-List" off and on since December 2005 (officially named on December 19, 2005). On June 7, 2007, Roast Beef asked Molly to marry him. Their wedding was just over a year later on July 5, 2008.

Early development of the series
In the early months of Achewood, the strip takes place entirely at Chris Onstad's house, and the four original characters—Philippe, Téodor, Lyle and Cornelius Bear—are implied to be essentially trapped there. Philippe's appearance at the front door causes some Trick-or-Treaters to exclaim in fear, "Holy Christ is That an Alive Stuffed Animal", and the friends are forced to hide when the pizza they ordered is delivered. There is no mention of having jobs, money or any real responsibilities. After Ray, Roast Beef and Pat are introduced, however, the characters begin to assume more complex personalities and exercise greater independence. This trend is accelerated during an extended story arc called "The Party", the first of the long-form storylines which would become a staple of Achewood. The transition from what had essentially been a gag-a-day comic was fairly abrupt – there is no run-up to "The Party." Instead, on March 12, 2002, all of the characters are shown lined up outside the Onstad residence waiting for Téodor to let them in and the comic concluded with the note "continued tomorrow." "The Party" introduces several supporting characters, including the robots, Ultra Peanut and Phillipe's mother.

Subsequent chapters establish more clearly defined relationships between the characters, add additional depth to their personalities, and follow the main players through major life events like "The Great Outdoor Fight".

Originally, Ray and Roast Beef were background characters, part of a trio of cats (along with Pat) who always appeared together and fancied themselves "the dirtiest dudes in town" due to their skill at vulgar insults. Originally, only Ray and Pat were given names. As time passed, Ray and Beef were given more and more panel time, eventually becoming the central characters of the strip, with the original four main characters taking on supporting roles.

Other features
Chris Onstad has also produced other material within the Achewood 'universe', including:
 Various blogs written by some of the comic's characters.
 A zine, Man Why You Even Got to Do a Thing, purportedly written by Roast Beef (publication halted since Issue 7).
 Two novellas by the character Nice Pete.
 The Achewood Cookbook, aimed mainly at beginners, in which the characters provide recipes and cooking advice. Onstad was frustrated by The French Laundry Cookbook, finding it "essentially useless to any home cook", and wrote his own cookbook aimed at "guys who are just out of college and have one pan and one electric burner". Onstad believed that doing such a task would be entertaining and challenging. Onstad visited a supermarket chain store and bought eggs, ground beef, and mustard, and created around 50 recipes based around them. The book includes recipes for cocktails, Scotch eggs, hot dogs, chicken, orzo, and other foods and drinks. Ray Smuckles presents all of the cocktails. Danielle Maestretti of Utne Reader said that the recipes range in appeal and complexity.
 A former feature called "Current Kid Status", in which Onstad documented the joys, travails and current events of raising his son. It ran from his son's birth in March 2005, until 27 November 2007. A compendium of these bits has been packaged into a book and is available for purchase at The Achewood Store.
 The Achewood Store, which includes such items as clothing, cookbooks, aprons, glasses and other assorted goods.
 A Twitter page, once featuring tweets about the daily activities of the Achewood characters, but now focusing on the life of Onstad himself.

Reception
As of April 10, 2007, Achewood received about ten million page views monthly. James Norton of Salon.com said that the "well-developed cast of characters, many of whom just happen to be seriously into good food" get the attention of the audience.

Awards
Achewood received the Ignatz Award in 2007 and 2008 for Outstanding Online Comic.

Time magazine's Lev Grossman named it Number One of the Top 10 Graphic Novels of 2007, praising its emotional range, the lyrical beauty of its otherwise at-times crude art, and referred to the series as "brilliant" and "profoundly genius." Grossman explained that it deserved to be listed, despite the fact that it was technically an Internet comic rather than a traditional hardcopy or even a graphic novel at all.

In November 2009, Achewood was named one of the Best Comics of the '00s by The A.V. Club.

Achewood has been nominated for multiple Web Cartoonists' Choice Awards:
 2004: 
 2005: 
 2008: ,  &

Author
Chris Onstad was born June 14, 1975, in California and grew up in a small town near Sonora, in the Sierra foothills. Onstad attended Stanford University, where he edited the Stanford Chaparral humor magazine. Onstad has published several books: nine anthologies of Achewood comics; a humorous cookbook featuring recipes purportedly invented by the strip's characters; A Wonderful Tale, a book written from the perspective of a character from the strip; and that same character's second novel A Hilarious Comedy. He has also published six editions of Man Why You Even Got to Do a Thing, an Achewood-centric zine.

Onstad reveals little of his private life online, but it is known that he currently lives in Portland, Oregon. His wife, Liz, assisted him as an accountant on the sale of Achewood merchandise. They have a son, born on March 14, 2005.  Onstad formerly had a section on his website about his son, titled "current kid status," which he updated regularly with stories and happenings. These are collected in the self-published book Current Baby Status – The Collected Archive.

In a February 23, 2012, interview with The Believer Onstad revealed that he had divorced from his wife.

In September 2013, Onstad launched a new business, Portland Soda Works.

Influences
Onstad remarked in an interview that "You can't help but be affected by Mark Twain books, Lay's Potato Chip ads, a fat lady who is yelling outside, David Letterman, etc." And elsewhere, to Brian M. Palmer, "The reader would likely be a better judge." He has expressed admiration for Chris Ware and Tony Millionaire. He has also claimed to be influenced by "Bryson, Barry, Twain, Elton, Wodehouse, Adams, Vonnegut, John Irving, Arthur Conan Doyle, Jack Handey, Al Franken, that sort of thing. Those sorts of guys. Tina Fey. Aaron Sorkin."

In another interview with Brian Palmer, he professed his admiration for the British comedy show Look Around You and also stated, "I haven't seen anything that tops Mr. Show."

In regards to the influence of the culinary culture, Onstad said that he always enjoyed eating food. Onstad said that when he met his wife, she was "a bit more of a cook" than he was; she had traveled to Italy to study abroad. Since he was, in his words, "mostly omnivorous" and she is a vegetarian, the two have to find food that can appeal to both of them. Onstad added that he is "competitive" and aims to "do a good job with these things and impress people." In addition, since Onstad's wife was an employee of Williams Sonoma, the two received discounted high end cookware that they normally would not have bought. On January 27, 2012, it was announced that Onstad would be the new food critic for the Portland Mercury.

Bibliography

Self-published 
Volume I – A Momentary Diversion on the Road to the Grave
Volume II – Worst Song, Played on Ugliest Guitar
Volume III – The Devil's Dictionary
Volume IV – Ten A.M. and Drunk as a Lord
Volume V – An Empty Cup of Rum
Volume VI – The Dude Is from Circumstances
Volume VII – Kiss My Ass, Bitch. I'll Be at Duane's
Volume VIII – Emergency Party At My Place
Volume IX – Soured on Beer and Given to Claims
The Achewood Cookbook
Nice Pete's A Wonderful Tale
Nice Pete's A Hilarious Comedy
Roast Beef's Man Why You Even Got to Do a Thing, Nos. 1, 2, 3, 4, 5 and 6
Current Baby Status
The Collected Achewood Blogs, Vol I, 1–31 July 2004

Published by Dark Horse Comics 
 Achewood: The Great Outdoor Fight (September 2008) 
 Collects strips from January 11, 2006, to March 30, 2006, plus bonus material
 Achewood Volume 2: Worst Song, Played on Ugliest Guitar (October 2009)
 Collects strips from January 10, 2002, to May 7, 2002, plus "Before We Were Achewood: The Early Experiments" (December 10, 2001 to December 17, 2001) and bonus material
 Achewood Volume 3: A Home For Scared People (April 2010)
 Collects strips from May 8, 2002, to October 29, 2002, plus "Before We Were Achewood, Concluded" (December 18, 2001 to January 9, 2002) and bonus material

References

External links 

 
 Interview of Chris Onstad by NPR

2000s webcomics
2010s webcomics
2001 webcomic debuts
American comedy webcomics
Webcomics in print
Ignatz Award winners for Outstanding Online Comic
Comics about cats